Vicars' Close, in Wells, Somerset, England, is claimed to be the oldest purely residential street with original buildings surviving intact in Europe.
John Julius Norwich called it "that rarest of survivals, a planned street of the mid-14th century". It comprises numerous Grade I listed buildings,
comprising 27 residences (originally 44), built for Bishop Ralph of Shrewsbury, a chapel and library at the north end, and a hall at the south end, over an arched gate. It is connected at its southern end to the cathedral by a walkway over Chain Gate.

When viewed from the other end it looks shorter. By the nineteenth century the buildings were reported to be in a poor state of repair, and part of the hall was being used as a malt house. Repairs have since been carried out including the construction of Shrewsbury House to replace buildings damaged in a fire.

The Vicars' Hall was completed in 1348 and included a communal dining room, administrative offices and treasury of the Vicars Choral. The houses on either side of the close were built in the 14th and early 15th centuries. Since then alterations have been made including a unified roof, front gardens and raised chimneys. The final part of the construction of the close was during the 1420s when the Vicars' Chapel and Library was constructed on the wall of the Liberty of St Andrew. The south face includes shields commemorating the bishops of the time. The interior is decorated with 19th-century gesso work by Heywood Sumner and the building now used by Wells Cathedral School.

Origins

The Close owes its origins to a grant of land and buildings by Walter de Hulle, a canon of Wells Cathedral, for the purpose of accommodating chantry priests; however the land is likely to have been used for a long period before the construction of the close, as prehistoric flint flakes and Romano-British pottery shards were recovered from the garden of number four during work to construct an extension.

Bishop Jocelin styled the priests serving the cathedral as the Vicars Choral, in the 12th century, their duty being to chant divine service eight times a day. Previously they had lived throughout the town, and Bishop Ralph resolved to incorporate them and provide subsistence for the future. The Vicars Choral were assigned annuities from his lands and tenements in Congresbury and Wookey, an annual fee from the vicarage of Chew, and endowed them with lands obtained from the Feoffees of Walter de Hulle.
The residences he built became known as the College, or Close of the Vicars.

Vicars' Hall and gateway

The entrance arch into the close comprises a pedestrian gate adjacent to a waggon gate, and has a lierne vault ceiling. The four-centered rere-arches may have been by William Joy or Thomas Witney his predecessor as master mason of the cathedral.

The first parts of the Close to be constructed were this first floor barrel-roofed common hall above a store room, kitchen and bakehouse which were completed in 1348. The fireplace, with a lectern, and the east window with stained glass, were added in the 15th century. A room known as The Chequer above the staircase was added in the early 15th century. It has a large fireplace which may have been enlarged following a fire. One of the vicars known as The Receiver sat in the room to receive rents and other funds due to the vicars, which were kept in a large chest dating from 1633. Next to The Chequer is the Muniment Room which has a filing cabinet dating from around 1420 used to hold documents such as leases of land. Beneath these rooms is The Treasury which has ten cupboards where the vicars vestments were stored.

In the 19th-century parts of the hall found use as a malt house, and as a library for the Theological College. The western half of the building was added around 1862 by John Henry Parker.

The Chain Gate, built with Doulting stone, was abutted to the hall in 1459 by Thomas Beckington. This included a gallery over the gate into the cathedral for the vicars' convenience.

Vicars' Chapel and Library

The chapel was built between 1424 and 1430 at the north end of the close. It is eight degrees out of alignment with the rest of the close. This is because the northern wall of the chapel was built on top of the old wall enclosing the Liberty of St Andrew. The Liberty encompassed  broadly situated to the east of the city centre of Wells. The main part of the Liberty formed a walled precinct within the city (which was otherwise not walled) and this included Wells Cathedral, the Cathedral Green, the Bishop's Palace, the Old Deanery, and the Vicars' Close. To compensate for the misalignment of the chapel the roof slopes to the west so that it appears level from the close.

Most of the Vicars' Chapel is rubble masonry however the south face which can be seen from the close is of white Conglomerate quarried locally. The shields on the wall are those of Nicholas Bubwith, suggesting that construction was started during his reign as bishop between 1407 and 1424, and John Stafford who was bishop from 1424 until 1443 suggesting that construction was completed under his episcopate. The lower floor was a chapel, and a spiral stair led up to the library. The chapel was dedicated to the Assumption of the Blessed Virgin Mary and St Katherine. It is now used by the chaplain of Wells Cathedral School. The interior is decorated with 19th-century gesso work by Heywood Sumner.

Residences

The residences are built of stone from the Mercia Mudstone Group. There were originally 22 houses on the east side and 20 on the west. They line each side of a quadrangle which appears longer than it is because of false perspective achieved by building the houses at the upper northern end nearest the chapel  closer together than those at the lower southern end closest to the Vicars' Hall. Both had a fireplace in the front wall. Washing facilities and a latrine were outside the back door. The date of some of the buildings is unclear but it is known that some had been built by 1363 and the rest were completed by 1412. There were originally 42 houses, each for one vicar, however in a charter of c.1582 Queen Elizabeth restricted the number of vicars to twenty, and the Vicars Choral currently number twelve men. No. 1 Vicars' Close was once a larger property, but has since been divided and part of the building is now called No. 1 St. Andrew Street.

Following the 16th-century Reformation when clerical marriage was permitted, larger households would have been required and as a result some of the houses were altered and combined by knocking through walls, into larger dwellings. Others had extensions built to the rear. Water supply was originally from two wells, one at each end of the close. By 1468 lead pipes had been installed to bring water into the houses, although the wells continued to function until the 19th century. Number 22 is the house which still has most of its original medieval structure as it was originally built.

In the fifteenth century, Bishop Thomas Beckington left much of his estate to the Vicars' Choral, enabling repairs to be carried out. The gardens in front of the houses were not part of the original scheme with the garden walls being added as part of this development. The walls are on average  from the front of the houses. He unified the appearance of the terraces including the installation of a single arch-braced and wind-braced trussed sloping roof around 1466. The chimney shafts were renewed and raised, possibly because of the introduction of coal as the fuel rather than wood. Each stack incorporates two heraldic shields and the upper sections of the stacks are octagonal. The shields are those of the Bishop, a beacon above tun, and the arms of his three executors; sugar loaves for Hugh Sugar, three swans for Richard Swan, and the talbot for John Pope. Many of the original windows were replaced in the 18th century. Shrewsbury House is architecturally different from all the other buildings. It was re-built in the 19th century after a fire that burnt down the original structure.

See also
Residences of other Vicars’ Choral:
 Vicars' Court, Lincoln
 College of Minor Canons, St Paul’s London 
 Exeter 
 Hereford 
 Bedern, York

References

External links

 Video explaining life in the close with the history and architecture

Buildings and structures completed in the 14th century
Buildings and structures in Wells, Somerset
Grade I listed buildings in Mendip District
Streets in Somerset
Roads in Somerset
Tourist attractions in Somerset
Wells Cathedral